Saint Mary's Township (also designated Township 16) is one of twenty townships within Wake County, North Carolina, United States. As of the 2010 census, Saint Mary's Township had a population of 58,484, a 52.8% increase over 2000.

Saint Mary's Township, occupying  in southeastern Wake County, includes most of the town of Garner and portions of the city of Raleigh.

References

Townships in Wake County, North Carolina
Townships in North Carolina